The Plymouth Caravelle is a mid-size sedan that was introduced by Plymouth as a 1983 Canadian model. The Caravelle came to the United States in 1985 to replace the Chrysler E-Class. It was essentially identical to the concurrent Dodge 600. It was replaced by the Plymouth Acclaim in 1989. The Caravelle was Plymouth's first front wheel drive mid-size sedan.

The name of the vehicle was inspired by the word Caravel, a 15th-century sailing ship used by the Portuguese; the ship was noted for its speed and agility.

United States

For 1985, the Chrysler brand dropped its unsuccessful entry-level variant of the E platform, the Chrysler E-Class (the idea of a more mainstream Chrysler was not well received by consumers). Even though the Dodge 600 was mainstream, Dodges were not generally sold with Chryslers, so rather than only having the upscale New Yorker on Chrysler-Plymouth dealer lots, the former E-Class was given a new grille and rebranded as a Plymouth and thus the U.S. Caravelle was created. This model was slotted between the compact Reliant K and the large rear-wheel drive Gran Fury.

For its first year the Caravelle came in one trim level with a number of standard features, the Caravelle SE. These standard features including: AM/FM stereo, power windows, power locks, power adjustable mirrors, deck lid release, cruise control, air conditioning, and a 50/50 split front bench seat, with dual recliners. For 1986, the Caravelle was given a facelift, which rounded many of the sharp angles, giving it a more aerodynamic appearance. Also from 1986 onward, a base model was offered, without some of the standard features of the "SE". The Caravelle continued in the U.S. until 1988, when it was replaced by the new A body Acclaim for 1989. Unlike the identical Canadian Caravelle, a 2-door coupe model was never offered in the U.S.

Engines
2.6L I4 - 1986 (replaced by Chrysler's 2.5 L engine)

Trim levels
Trim levels for U.S. version, 1985-1988
SE - 1985-1988
base - 1986-1988

Production figures for U.S. version:

Figures obtained from  Encyclopedia of American Cars

Canada

In Canada, the Caravelle first appeared for the 1978 model year as a version of the Dodge Diplomat for Canadian Chrysler-Plymouth dealers. As all Chrysler Canada dealers sold Chryslers, only the top-of-the-line LeBaron was sold in Canada, and the Diplomat and Caravelle did not offer the top line models. The top of the range Caravalle was approximately $670 cheaper than the LeBaron. Between 1978 and mid-1981, all Caravelles were built at the Chrysler plant in St Louis. In 1983, Chrysler Canada added the E-body version of the Dodge 600, also offering it as a Plymouth Caravelle. The rear wheel drive Caravelle then became the Caravelle Salon, rather than taking the American "Gran Fury" name. Also in 1983, Chrysler Canada added a Caravelle version of the Dodge 400 2-door coupe. Thus the Caravelle came in three sizes based on three platforms - K, E, and M.

The coupe was dropped after 1986 while sedan production came to an end in 1988. Like the U.S. version, the Canadian Caravelle was replaced by the Plymouth Acclaim for 1989. The Caravelle Salon, which was the original rear wheel drive version, survived until 1989.

References

 Allpar.com - Plymouth Caravelle front wheel drive
 Allpar.com - Plymouth Caravelle Salon rear wheel drive

Caravelle
Front-wheel-drive vehicles
Rear-wheel-drive vehicles
Mid-size cars
Coupés
Sedans
1980s cars
Cars introduced in 1983
Cars of Canada
Cars discontinued in 1988